How to Disappear Completely and Never Be Found is a how-to book by Doug Richmond, originally released in 1985.

Plot
The book is a guide on starting a new identity. It includes chapters on planning a disappearance, arranging for new identification, finding work, establishing credit, pseudocide (creating the impression of one's own death), and more. The book recommends a method of disappearing by assuming the identity of a dead person with similar vital statistics and age, and also includes a section on avoiding paper trails which, due to the age of the book, may no longer be relevant or useful.

Adaptations
A play inspired by the book was released in 2005 by Fin Kennedy, about a man wanting to disappear, which won the John Whiting Award.

The Polish ambient music collective ‘How To Disappear Completely’ is named after the book.

The title for Radiohead's song 'How To Disappear Completely', from their 2000 album Kid A, is a reference to Richmond.

References

1985 non-fiction books
Handbooks and manuals
'